William Robert de la Cour Shirley (13 October 1900 – 23 April 1970) was an English cricketer. A right-handed batsman and right-arm fast-medium bowler, he played first-class cricket between 1922 and 1925, primarily for Hampshire. He also played first-class cricket for Cambridge University and the Free Foresters in addition to representing the Nigeria national cricket team.

Biography
Born in Marylebone in 1900, William Shirley was educated at Eton and Cambridge University, playing cricket for both institutions. He made his first-class debut in 1922, playing for Free Foresters against Cambridge University. He made his debut for Hampshire in a County Championship match against Warwickshire, a match that was described by Wisden as "extraordinary". In the match, Hampshire were bowled out for just 15 in their first innings and were forced to follow on 203 runs behind. They then scored 521 and won the match by 155 runs.

He played ten more County Championship matches for Hampshire that season, and played a further 19 the next season. The 1924 season started with him playing for Cambridge University against various county sides, the Marylebone Cricket Club (MCC), the Army, the Free Foresters and South Africa. He gained his blue when he played against Oxford University at Lord's in July. In addition to his matches for the university, he also played 14 County Championship matches for Hampshire.

His last season in first-class cricket was in 1925, when he played four County Championship matches for Hampshire in May, the last coming against Lancashire. This was not the end of his cricket career though, as he played five times for Nigeria against the Gold Coast whilst living there between 1928 and 1938. He died in Bognor Regis in 1970, aged 69.

Cricket statistics
In his 62 first-class matches, Shirley scored 1458 runs at an average of 17.78 with a top score of 90 made for Hampshire against Glamorgan in his first season. He took 81 wickets at an average of 23.60, with best innings bowling figures of 4/10 for Cambridge University against Lancashire in 1924.

In his five matches for Nigeria against the Gold Coast, he scored 350 runs at an average of 43.75 and took 21 wickets at an average of 15.00.

References

1900 births
1970 deaths
People from Marylebone
English cricketers
Nigerian cricketers
Hampshire cricketers
Cambridge University cricketers
Free Foresters cricketers
People educated at Eton College